Prananiki Pranam is a 1990 Telugu-language action film produced by A. Kodandarami Reddy under the Harish Enterprises banner, directed by T. Trivikrama Rao. It stars Nandamuri Balakrishna, Rajani and music composed by Chakravarthy.

Plot
The film begins with Raja an orphan brought up by a netherworld kingpin Nagu Dada who is his heartthrob. He loathes his unfamiliar mother as she has thrown him in the dustbin soon after giving birth. Rasool is the contender of Dada for whom Raja is the die-harder and a jeopardy gang war continues. Justice Jayanti Devi a woman of rectitude arrives in the town. Once, Raja rescues her from danger when an unknown bond builds between them. Knowing it, Dada dismays because Raja is the son of Jayanti Devi. In prior 25 years ago, Giri son of Nagu Dada mauls his fellow collegian and Gayatri Devi destines him to hang. To pay back, Dada abducted Raja and reared him with cupboard love, and forged his mother as vile.

In tandem, Raja crushes Lalitha the niece of Jayanti Devi which she opposes, because Raja is the foster of Nagu Dada. Accordingly, Dada counterfeits as reformed and shuts down his nefarious activities on behalf of Raja. After a while, Bahadoor the past acolyte of Dada mingles with Rasool and spells ill about him. So, Raja on fire revolts and challenges to kill him. Exploiting it, Nagu Dada slays Bahadoor and incriminates Raja. In that dilemma, Raja suspects Rasool strikes on him but getting knowledge of his virtue, the two befriend him. Later, upon Jayanti Devi's advice, Raja surrenders but in keeping with witnesses, she penalizes him with a death sentence. Anyhow, he absconds with the help of Rasool. Then, Nagu Dada reveals the actuality to Jayanti Devi and also announces to Raja that Jayanti Devi is his mother when he rebukes her. In the next step, Rasool brings out the satanic shade of Dada, the sacredness of his mother before Raja by sacrificing his life. At last, Raja ceases Dada and pleads for pardon from his mother. The movie ends on a happy note with the marriage between Raja and Lalitha.

Cast

Nandamuri Balakrishna as Raja
Rajani as Lalitha
Mohan Babu as Rasool
Satyanarayana as Nagu Dada
Vanisri as Justice Jayanti Devi 
Anand Raj as Bahadoor
Sridhar 
Maharshi Raghava as Giri
Suthi Velu 
Brahmanandam 
Jaya Bhaskar 
Bhimeswara Rao
Chidatala Appa Rao
Sri Lakshmi
Tatineni Rajeswari 
Bindu Ghosh 
Sailaja

Soundtrack

Music composed by Chakravarthy. Lyrics were written by Veturi. Music released on LEO Audio Company.

References

External links

1990 films
1990s Telugu-language films
Films scored by K. Chakravarthy